Gainsborough was rural district in Lincolnshire, Parts of Lindsey from 1894 to 1974.

It was formed under the Local Government Act 1894 from that part of the Gainsborough rural sanitary district which was in Lindsey (the Nottinghamshire part becoming the Misterton Rural District).  It was reduced in 1936 under a County Review Order by ceding the parishes of Haxey, Owston Ferry and West Butterwick, all part of the Isle of Axholme, to the Isle of Axholme Rural District.

It was abolished in 1974 under the Local Government Act 1972, and incorporated into the new district of West Lindsey.

References

http://www.visionofbritain.org.uk/relationships.jsp?u_id=10153815&c_id=10001043

Districts of England created by the Local Government Act 1894
Districts of England abolished by the Local Government Act 1972
Rural districts of Lindsey